Jozef Gašpar Tiso (13 October 1887 – 18 April 1947) was a Slovak politician and Roman Catholic priest who served as president of the Slovak Republic, a client state of Nazi Germany during World War II, from 1939 to 1945. In 1947, after the war, he was executed for treason in Bratislava.

Born in 1887 to Slovak parents in Nagybiccse (today Bytča), then part of Hungary, Austria-Hungary, Tiso studied several languages during his school career, including Hebrew and German. He was introduced to priesthood from an early age, and helped combat local poverty and alcoholism in what is now Slovakia. He joined the Slovak People's Party in 1918 and became party leader in 1938 following the death of Andrej Hlinka. On 14 March 1939, the Slovak Assembly in Bratislava unanimously adopted Law 1/1939 transforming the autonomous Slovak Republic (that was until then part of Czechoslovakia) into an independent country. Two days after Nazi Germany seized the remainder of the Czech Lands, the Protectorate of Bohemia and Moravia was proclaimed.

Jozef Tiso, who was already the prime minister of the autonomous Slovakia (under Czechoslovak laws), became the Slovak Republic's prime minister, and, in October 1939, he was elected its president.

Tiso collaborated with Germany in deportations of Jews, deporting many Slovak Jews to extermination and concentration camps in Germany and German-occupied Poland, while some Jews in Slovakia were murdered outright. Deportations were executed between 25 March 1942 until 20 October 1942. An anti-fascist partisan insurgency was waged, culminating in the Slovak National Uprising in summer 1944, which was suppressed by German military authorities, with many of its leaders executed. Consequently, on 30 September 1944, deportations of Jews were renewed, with additional 13,500 deported.

When the Soviet Red Army overran the last parts of western Slovakia in April 1945, Tiso fled to Austria and then Germany, where American troops arrested him and then had him extradited back to the restored Czechoslovakia, where he was convicted of high treason, betrayal of the national uprising and collaboration with the Nazis, and then executed by hanging in 1947 and buried in Bratislava. In 2008, his remains were buried in the canonical crypt of the Catholic Cathedral in Nitra, Slovakia.

Early life
Tiso was born in Bytča (then ) to Slovak parents, in Trencsén County, of the Kingdom of Hungary, part of the Austro-Hungarian Empire. He was raised in a religious family and studied at the local elementary school. Then, as a good student with a flair for languages, he studied at a lower grammar school in Žilina. The school had clearly Hungarian spirit, since all Slovak grammar schools were closed at the time of his study. Here, he began to use the Hungarian form of his name Tiszó József. In 1902, he began to study at higher Piarist grammar school in Nitra. The Bishop of Nitra, Imre Bende, offered him a chance to study for the priesthood at the prestigious Pázmáneum in Vienna. Tiso, taught by several elite professors, became familiar with various philosophies and the newest Papal Encyclicals. He also extended his language skills. Along with already known Hungarian, German and Latin, he studied Hebrew, Aramaic dialects and Arabic. The school reports describe him mostly as an "excellent", "exemplary", and "pious" student. Enrolling in the University of Vienna in 1906, he graduated as a Doctor of Theology in 1911.

His early ministry was spent as an assistant priest in three parishes in today's Slovakia. Tiso was interested in public affairs and performed extensive educational and social work. During his fight against poverty and alcoholism, he may also have adopted some stereotypical and simplified views on Slovak-Jewish relations. Such views were not unusual in the contemporary society, including among priests or other people with higher education. He blamed the Jewish tavern owners for the rising alcoholism and he was also a member of self-help association selling food and clothing cheaper than the local Jewish store. Tiso became a member of Nép párt (Catholic People's Party) and contributed to its Slovak journal Kresťan (Christian).

During the World War I, he served as a field curate of the 71st infantry regiment of the Austro-Hungarian Army recruited mostly from Slovak soldiers. The regiment suffered heavy losses in Galicia. Tiso got first-hand experience with horrors of war, but also with Germanisation and Russification of the local population. After a few months, his regiment was transferred to Slovenia, where he met Slovenian politician Anton Korošec, who was also a Roman Catholic priest. Tiso was inspired by a better organization of the Slovenian national movement. Tiso's military career was ended by a serious kidney illness and he was released from the military service. He did not return to his parish in Bánovce, but he was appointed as the Spiritual Director of the Nitra seminary by Bende's successor, Vilmos Batthyány. Tiso was also active at this time as a school teacher and journalist. He published his experiences from the war ("The Diary from the Northern Frontline"). In other articles written in a patriotic style, he emphasized the need for good military morale and discipline. 
However, this was nothing unusual, and it reflected a common style of the contemporary press, including a limited set of still printed Slovak newspapers. He also covered religious and educational topics, emphasizing a need for religious literature in Slovak.

Tiso did not belong to politicians active in the pre-war national movement and his pre-war national orientation has been frequently questioned. His political opponents tried to draw him as a Magyarone (Magyarized Slovak) while some Slovak nationalists sought for proofs of his early national orientation. Both views are largely simplified. Tiso carefully avoided national self-categorization language, his behaviour might be framed in a "national indifference" approach - a practice largely spread in Central Europe before 1918. His only criticism targeted the Jews. In some of his pre-1918 writings Tiso complained about the state hierarchy or the ruling Liberal party, but he never denounced the Magyarisation or the Magyar nationalism. At the same time, he was more focused on social and religious activities among the Slovaks without revealing his ethnic or national self-identification. Most importantly, Tiso publicly acted as a loyal subject of the Habsburg dynasty. Interestingly that his writings rather reveals that his identity was stronger linked to the entire monarchy of Austria-Hungary, than to the Kingdom of Hungary, whose citizen he formally was.

Collapse of Austria-Hungary 
In the autumn of 1918, Tiso recognized that the Austro-Hungarian monarchy was unsustainable. He also understood that the historical Kingdom of Hungary could not be preserved anymore. Regardless of the formal Czechoslovak declaration of independence, the way to real control of Czechoslovak bodies over Slovakia was not straightforward. Also, it was still unclear to which state Nitra would belong after the dissolution of Austria-Hungary. In these conditions, he began to prepare his readers for the new state and political regime. On 8 December 1918, the Hungarian National Council in Nitra delegated him to negotiate with the Czechoslovak Army which was invited to "restore and maintain public order". Tiso was named secretary of new Slovak National Council and embraced politics as a career.

First Czechoslovak republic
In December 1918, Tiso became a member of the restored Slovak People's Party (Slovenská ľudová strana, so called "Ľudáks"). The party supported the idea of parliamentary democracy, defended interests of its Slovak Catholic voters and sought Slovak autonomy within the Czecho-Slovakia framework. Tiso, largely unknown before the coup, gradually strengthened his position in the party hierarchy. His elite education, high intelligence, energy, large working experiences with common people and his ability to speak in common terms made him a popular speaker and journalist of the party. 
In 1919, he founded a subsidiary of the party in Nitra and he organized a gymnastic organization, Orol (Eagle), the counterweight of a similar Czech/Czechoslovak organization Sokol. Tiso first ran for parliament in the 1920 Czechoslovak parliamentary election. Although the electoral results from his district were bright spots in what was otherwise a disappointing election for the Ľudáks, the party did not reward him with a legislative seat. Tiso, however, easily claimed one in the 1925 election, which also resulted in a breakthrough victory for the party. Until 1938, he was a fixture in the Czecho-Slovakian parliament in Prague.

In 1921 Tiso was appointed Monsignor by the Vatican, although this appointment lapsed with the later death of Pope Benedict XV. From 1921 to 1923, he served as the secretary to the new Slovak bishop of Nitra, Karol Kmeťko. During the same period, nationalist political agitation earned Tiso two convictions by the Czechoslovak courts for incitement, one of which resulted in a short incarceration. Displeased, Kmeťko dropped him as secretary in 1923, but retained him as a Professor of Theology. In 1924, Tiso left Nitra to become dean of Bánovce nad Bebravou. He remained the Dean of Bánovce for the rest of his political career, returning there regularly every weekend also as a Czechoslovak minister, and as later as president.

In the interwar period, Tiso was a moderate politician and his ability to reach compromises made him a respected mediator of the party. He used more radical rhetoric as a journalist, putting aside much of the anti-Jewish rhetoric of his earlier journalistic activities. He attacked his opponents and did not always control his emotions. However, he usually returned to rational arguments in official political negotiations. Tiso sharply criticized policies of the central government regarding Slovaks and Slovakia. While the party still operated within a democratic framework, Tiso's colleague and political rival Vojtech Tuka formed two internal movements to oppose the state or its regime - the first collaborating with Hungarian irredentism and the second led by pro-fascist Rodobrana. Tiso did not participate in these.

In the late 1920s, Tiso became one of the party's leaders. When the president of the party Andrej Hlinka traveled in 1926 to the 28th International Eucharistic Congress in Chicago, he delegated Tiso to represent him in the presidium of the party. In his absence, Tiso led complicated negotiations about an entry of HSĽS into the government. He was successful and thus strengthened his position. In January 1927, he became the Czechoslovak Minister of Health and Physical Education. Since HSĽS previously operated as an opposition party and was not able to fulfill all of its promises, the participation in the government led to the loss of credibility. Tiso again proved his speaker skills and supported the decision to participate in the government. As a minister, Tiso successfully realized several important health service projects in Slovakia. Surprisingly, he refused the government ministry flat, staying in one of Prague monasteries. In October 1929, HSĽS left the government after the Tuka affair. Tiso was more inclined than Hlinka to find compromises with other parties to form alliances, but for a decade after 1929 his initiatives were not successful. In 1930, he became the official vice-president of the party and seemed destined to succeed Hlinka. He spent the 1930s competing for Hlinka's mantle with party radicals, most notably the rightist Karol Sidor – Tuka was in prison for much of this period for treason.

In 1930, Tiso published The Ideology of the Hlinka's Slovak People's Party explaining his views on the Czech-Slovak relationship. Notably, he claimed sovereignty of the Slovak nation over the territory of Slovakia and indirectly suggested the right of Slovaks to adopt also different solutions for things than the Czechoslovakian government in Prague. He repeated the same idea in his parliamentary speeches.

By the middle 1930s, Tiso's views shifted toward authoritarian and totalitarian ideas. He repeatedly declared that HSĽS was the only party representing the Slovaks and the only party which spoke for the Slovak nation. These claims played a significant role in the later end of the democratic regime. "One nation, one party, one leader", Tiso declared at the party congress held in 1936. The party should cover all aspects of the life.

In 1938, with increasing pressure from Nazi Germany and Hungary, the representatives of HSĽS questioned neighboring states on their views for the future of Slovakia. In May 1938, Tiso held secret negotiations with the Hungarian Foreign Minister Affairs Kálmán Kánya during a eucharistic congress in Budapest. He declared that Slovakia might be prepared to rejoin Hungary as an autonomous federal state should Czechoslovakia cease to exist. However, the meeting did not go well. Tiso was disappointed by Kánya's attitude and alleged Hungarian historical claims on Slovakia and felt Kánya's behaviour was lofty and arrogant. He concluded that Hungary was not seriously interested in a common agreement and was focused more on the dissolution of Czechoslovakia, as was Germany. Therefore, well aware of the weak economic position of Slovakia, the lack of qualified people and an unstable international situation, he felt he was stuck with Czechoslovakia for the time being. When Hlinka died in August 1938, Tiso quickly consolidated control of the Ľudák party. Tiso was an official speaker from the party at Hlinka's funeral where he urged national unity and loyalty to the Czechoslovak republic. He, however, continued negotiations with the central government in Prague, explained the goals of potential autonomy and refused a military solution of the Czechoslovak-German crisis.

Autonomous Slovak Region
In October 1938, following the Munich Agreement, Germany annexed and occupied the Sudetenland, the main German-speaking parts of Czecho-Slovakia. On 6 October 1938, HSĽS took advantage of the weakening of central government and declared autonomy for Slovakia (some other parties in Slovakia supported this). The next day, he became Prime Minister of the Slovak Autonomous Region.

One of his first tasks was to lead the Czechoslovak delegation during negotiations with Hungary in Komárno preceding the First Vienna Award. Prime Minister Tiso, who had never led a delegation in similar international negotiations, found himself in a difficult position. The central government of the Second Czechoslovak Republic (under the pressure of terrorist actions sponsored by the Hungarian government) and after serious changes of the international situation) accepted negotiations before being completely ready, and the government also found itself overloaded while trying to stabilize the situation with Germany. Tiso opposed the proposals of the Hungarian delegation but acted as a flexible and patient negotiator. When the Hungarian delegation refused further discussion, Tiso sought the help of Germany. This had already been promised by German Foreign Minister Joachim von Ribbentrop, if necessary. Later, Tiso was shocked by the First Vienna Award, so much so that he initially refused to sign the protocol. In a radio speech to the citizens, Tiso did not mention Ribbentrop's promise, but blamed the Prague government and its "policies of the past twenty years".

The day before the award, police arrested several Jews at a demonstration of the Hungarian Youth Organization calling for the cession of Komárno to Hungary. Their participation was then used in propaganda blaming the Jews for the result (Nazi Germany and Fascist Italy obviously did not carry out "the wish of the Jewry" but followed their own interests). On 3 November 1938, Tiso met with Jozef Faláth (the head of the "central office for the Jewish question" who had already contacts to Nazi Party politicians in Vienna) and Jozef Kirschbaum. Tiso, who was otherwise a relatively pragmatic politician, adopted an unusually firm solution. On 4 November 1938 he ordered the deportation of Jews "without property", and later those without citizenship, to the territory now annexed by Hungary. His government then deported more than 7,500 people including elderly people, pregnant women, and at least 570 children under age 15 to no man's land in rainy autumn weather. On 7 November, he cancelled the action.

As a prime minister and minister of the interior of the autonomous government, Tiso had extensive powers. In October–December 1938, his government did not share power with any other Slovak public body, because the autonomous parliament was elected only thereafter. During this period, HSĽS forbade activities of all political parties except those that agreed to join the governing coalition "voluntarily" and two parties representing minority populations, the "German Party" and the "Unified Hungarian Party". HSĽS then organized rigged parliamentary elections. Even before the official announcement of the elections, Tiso told the German newspaper Völkischer Beobachter that there would be only one united ballot and Jews could not be elected. The deportations and some other actions of Tiso's autonomous government were against the Czechoslovak Constitution of 1920.

Slovak secession

In February 1939, Dr Tiso entered into negotiations with Germany for a fully independent Slovakia, separated from Czechoslovakia. He held direct meetings with the German representative Arthur Seyss-Inquart, in which Tiso initially expressed doubts as to whether an independent Slovakia would be a viable entity. Czech military units subsequently occupied Slovakia and forced Tiso out of office on 9 March. However the Ruthenians, also resentful of the inclusion of their lands in Czechoslovakia, and the oppressions of the Prague government, now also sought autonomy.

Tiso's Catholic-conservative feelings initially inhibited him from what appeared to be revolutionary moves. However, within a few days Hitler invited Tiso to Berlin, and offered assistance for Slovak nationhood. Hitler suggested that Slovakia should declare independence under German protection (i.e.: Protectorate status), and that if not Hungary might annex the remaining territory of Slovakia. Without making an agreement, Tiso now requested the Czecho-Slovak President to call a meeting of the Slovak Diet for 14 March. During that session Tiso made a speech informing the Diet of his conversation with Hitler, confirming that he reserved any move for an independence decision to come from the Slovak Diet. On the initiative of the President of the assembly, Martin Sokol (himself previously a strong proponent of the Czecho-Slovak state with guaranteed autonomy for Slovakia), endorsed a declaration of independence. On 15 March, Germany occupied the remaining rump of Czechoslovakia after Hitler coerced a sick Czech President Emil Hácha into acquiescing.

Slovakia became the Slovak Republic, an independent state (under German protection) which was formally recognised by the Soviet Union and Germany, with de facto recognition by the United Kingdom and France (but not by the United States who were largely responsible, in 1919, for the new artificial state of Czechoslovakia). Czech émigrés and the United States considered Slovakia a puppet state of Germany. After the later recognition of the Czechoslovak government-in-exile by Great Britain, the British Foreign Office notified the Czech Foreign Ministry that Britain did not recognise any territorial claims of Czechoslovakia, nor could they commit to any fixed boundaries for the state, nor recognise the legal continuation of Czechoslovakia.

Tiso was initially Prime Minister from 14 March 1939 until 26 October 1939. Tiso not only supported Nazi Germany's invasion of Poland in September 1939 but contributed Slovak troops, which the Germans rewarded by allowing Slovakia to annex 300 square miles of Polish territory. On 1 October 1939, Dr Tiso officially became President of the Slovak People's Party. On 26 October, he became President of the Slovak Republic, and appointed Tuka as Prime Minister. After 1942, President Tiso was also styled Vodca ("Leader"), an imitation of German Führer.

Anti-semitism and deportation of Jews

At the Salzburg Conference on 28 July 1940, an agreement was reached to establish a National Socialist regime in Slovakia. Tuka attended the conference, as did Hitler, Tiso, Joachim von Ribbentrop, Alexander Mach (head of the Hlinka Guards), and Franz Karmasin, head of the local Carpathian German minority. As a result of the conference, two state agencies were created to deal with "Jewish affairs". The "Salzburg Summit" resulted in closer collaboration with Germany, and in Tuka and other political leaders increasing their powers at the expense of Tiso's original concept of a Catholic corporate state. The agreement called for dual command by the Slovak People's Party and the Hlinka Guard (HSĽS), and also an acceleration in Slovakia's anti-Jewish policies. The Nazi government appointed Sturmabteilung leader Manfred von Killinger as the German representative in Slovakia. Tiso however accepted these changes in subsequent conversation with Hitler. SS Officer Dieter Wisliceny was dispatched to Slovakia to act as an "adviser" on Jewish issues. The Party under Tiso and Tuka's leadership aligned itself with Nazi policy by implementing anti-semitic legislation in Slovakia. The main act was the Jewish Code, under which Jews in Slovakia could not own any real estate or luxury goods, were excluded from public office and free occupations, could not participate in sport or cultural events, were excluded from secondary schools and universities, and were required to wear the Star of David in public. Tiso himself had anti-semitic views (as his earlier journalism made clear) which were widespread in Slovakia.

Although there are dissenting opinions by modern politicians on his role in the Jewish deportations from Slovakia, it is clear that, in line with German policy and "suggestions" as well as his earlier anti-semitism, he encouraged these actions, despite condemnation of the deportations from some Slovak bishops. In February 1942, Slovakia became the first Nazi ally to agree to deportations. The Nazis had asked for 20,000 young able-bodied Jews for labour duties. Tiso had hoped that compliance would aid in the return of 120,000 Slovak workers from Germany. In August 1942, after the majority of Slovak Jews had been sent to German-occupied Poland and it became clear that the deportees were being systematically murdered, Tiso gave a speech in Holič in which he called for Slovaks to "cast off your parasite [the Jews]" and justified continuing deportations of Jews from Slovakia. On 30 August, Hitler commented "It is interesting how this little Catholic priest Tiso is sending us the Jews!". Vatican undersecretary Domenico Tardini complained: "Everyone understands that the Holy See cannot stop Hitler. But who can understand that it does not know how to rein in a priest?"

Later in 1942, amid Vatican protests as news of the fate of the deportees filtered back, and the German advance into the Soviet Union was halted, Slovakia then became the first of Hitler's puppet states to shut down the deportations. Mazower wrote: "When the Vatican protested, the government responded with defiance: 'There is no foreign intervention which would stop us on the road to the liberation of Slovakia from Jewry', insisted President Tiso". Distressing scenes at railway yards of deportees being beaten by Hlinka guards had brought protests, including from leading churchmen such as Bishop Pavol Jantausch. The Vatican called in the Slovak ambassador twice to enquire as to what was happening in Slovakia. According to British historian Richard Evans, these interventions "caused Tiso, who after all was still a priest in holy orders, to have second thoughts about the programme". Giuseppe Burzio and others reported to Tiso that the Germans were murdering the deported Jews. Tiso hesitated and then refused to deport Slovakia's 24,000 remaining Jews. According to Mazower, "Church pressure and public anger resulted in perhaps 20,000 Jews being granted exemptions, effectively bringing the deportations there to an end".

When in 1943 rumours of further deportations emerged, the Papal Nuncio in Istanbul, Msgr. Angelo Roncalli (later Pope John XXIII) and Burzio helped galvanize the Holy See into intervening in vigorous terms. On 7 April 1943, Burzio challenged Tuka over the rumours of extermination of Slovak Jews. The Vatican then condemned the renewal of the deportations on 5 May and the Slovakian episcopate issued a pastoral letter condemning totalitarianism and antisemitism on 8 May 1943. According to Evans, Tuka was "forced to backtrack by public protests, especially from the Church, which by this time had been convinced of the fate that awaited the deportees. Pressure from the Germans, including a direct confrontation between Hitler and Tiso on 22 April 1943, remained without effect."

In August 1944, the Slovak National Uprising broke out against the Tiso government. German troops were sent to quell this and with them came Einsatzgruppe H and security police charged with rounding up or murdering Slovakia's remaining Jews. During the German occupation, another 13,500 Jews were deported, most of them to Auschwitz, and 5,000 imprisoned. Some were murdered in Slovakia itself, in particular at Kremnička and Nemecká.

Tiso remained in office during the German army's occupation, but his presidency was relegated to a mostly titular role as Slovakia lost whatever de facto independence it had. Burzio begged Tiso directly to at least spare Catholics of Jewish ancestry from deportation and delivered an admonition from the Pope: "the injustice wrought by his government is harmful to the prestige of his country and enemies will exploit it to discredit clergy and the Church the world over".

By the end of the Holocaust, more than two-thirds of the Jews living in Slovakia had been murdered.

Conviction and execution

Tiso lost all remnants of power when the Soviet Red Army conquered the last parts of western Slovakia in April 1945. He fled first to Austria, then to a Capuchin monastery in Altötting, Bavaria. In June 1945, he was arrested by the Americans and extradited to the reconstituted Czechoslovakia to stand trial in October 1945. On 15 April 1947, the Czechoslovak National Court (Národný súd) found him guilty of many of the allegations against him, and sentenced him to death for "state treason, betrayal of the antifascist partisan insurrection and collaboration with Nazism".

The court concluded that Tiso's government had been responsible for the break-up of the Czechoslovak Republic; and found Tiso guilty of:

 administering a more radical "solution" of the Jewish question
 establishing a totalitarian fascist regime under the slogan "One God, one nation, one organisation" by founding the fascist organisations HSĽS (Hlinka's Slovak People's Party), Hlinkova garda (Hlinka Guard), and Hlinkova mládež (Hlinka Youth), the last two with compulsory membership
 destroying democracy
 awarding Karl Hermann Frank the Grand Cross following Frank's involvement in Czech students' murders and the Lidice massacre
 allowing the military occupation of the western part of Slovakia by the Wehrmacht, which seized state military assets valued 2 billion Ks and transported them to Nazi Germany
 persecuting and terrorizing the regime's 3,000 opponents, who were imprisoned, tortured, and, for some, slaughtered in the Ilava concentration camp
 expropriating the assets of the Czechs and the Jews by the Hlinka Guard
 damaging the state finances in the amount of 8.6 billions Ks due to clearing for Nazi Germany, another 3-4 billion Ks by supplying the Wehrmacht, and 7 billion Ks by secretly supplying the German occupational forces
 inciting of hatred against the Jews, excluding them from public life and economy, and restricting their personal freedom
 approving the Jewish Code, under which Jews in Slovakia were deprived of human rights, and were deported to the Sereď concentration camp and Nováky concentration camp, while Tiso sold some Jews under exceptions to the Code
 approving deportation of 57,837 Jews to German concentration camps in 1942 who were subsequently murdered, and paying for it with 100 million Ks to Nazi Germany
 delivering POWs to the German occupation forces knowing they would be murdered
 allowing the Gestapo and Sicherheitsdienst to imprison, torture, and abduct people, including Slovaks, before the Slovak National Uprising
 ordering the Hlinka Guard and other fascist organisations to help the German occupational forces catch, imprison, torture, and slaughter 4,316 people suspected of involvement in the Uprising and abduct 30,000 people to German concentration camps
 tolerating destruction of numerous villages (e.g. Kľak or Nemecká) by German occupational forces (e.g. Edelweiss (anti-partisan unit)) and the Hlinka Guard
 mobilising for German occupation forces
 allowing German occupational forces to abduct Slovaks for forced labour in Nazi Germany
 ordering civilians to take part in military fortification work for German occupational forces
 approving an eastern part of Slovakia to be declared operational territory of German forces and subjecting the Slovak Army to the German military leadership
 and many other crimes

Tiso was sentenced to death, to deprivation of his civil rights, and to confiscation of all of his property. Tiso appealed to the Czechoslovak president Edvard Beneš and expected a reprieve; his prosecutor had recommended clemency. However, no reprieve was forthcoming. Wearing his clerical outfit, Tiso was hanged in Bratislava on 18 April 1947. The Czechoslovak government buried him secretly to avoid having his grave become a shrine, but far-right followers of Tiso soon identified the grave in the St Martin cemetery in Bratislava as his. Decades later, after a DNA test in April 2008 that confirmed it, the body of Tiso was exhumed and buried  in St Emmeram's Cathedral in Nitra, in accordance with canon law.

Reputation
Under communism, Tiso was formulaically denounced as a clerical Fascist. With the fall of communism in 1989, and the subsequent independence of Slovakia, heated debate began again on his role. James Mace Ward writes in Tiso's biography Priest, Politician, Collaborator (2013): "At its worst, [the debate] was fuel for an ultranationalist attempt to reconstruct Slovak society, helping to destabilize Czechoslovakia. At its best, the debate inspired a thoughtful reassessment of Tiso and encouraged Slovaks to grapple with the legacy of collaboration."

Far-right admirers of Tiso created a highly controversial memorial grave in Martin cemetery that is mainly ignored by society; only a handful of ultranationalists or elderly people commemorate Tiso. Ultranationalist propaganda proclaims Tiso as a "martyr" who "sacrificed his life for his belief and nation", and so tries to paint him as an innocent victim of communism and a saint.

References

Sources

External links

 The Tiso plaque controversy
 Slovak Jews fear campaign to make fascism respectable
 Jozef Tiso - Slovak statehood at the bitter price of allegiance to Nazi Germany
 

1887 births
1947 deaths
People from Bytča
People from the Kingdom of Hungary
Slovak Roman Catholic priests
Slovak People's Party politicians
Members of the Chamber of Deputies of Czechoslovakia (1925–1929)
Members of the Chamber of Deputies of Czechoslovakia (1929–1935)
Members of the Chamber of Deputies of Czechoslovakia (1935–1939)
Prime Ministers of Slovakia
Slovak anti-communists
Slovak fascists
Antisemitism in Slovakia
Late modern Christian antisemitism
Anti-Masonry
World War II political leaders
Czechoslovak Roman Catholic priests
Catholicism and far-right politics
Catholic priests convicted of crimes
Christian fascists
Slovak independence activists
University of Vienna alumni
Austro-Hungarian military personnel of World War I
Slovak collaborators with Nazi Germany
Holocaust perpetrators in Slovakia
Heads of government who were later imprisoned
Heads of government convicted of war crimes
Heads of state convicted of war crimes
Executed Czechoslovak collaborators with Nazi Germany
Executed presidents
Executed prime ministers
Executed Roman Catholic priests
Executed Slovak people
People executed by Czechoslovakia by hanging
People executed for war crimes
People executed by the Third Republic of Czechoslovakia